The 1951 North Carolina A&T Aggies football team was an American football team that represented the North Carolina Agricultural and Technical State University as a member of the Central Intercollegiate Athletic Association (CIAA) during the 1951 college football season. In their sixth season under head coach William M. Bell, the Aggies compiled a 7–1–1 record (5–1 in conference play) and outscored opponents by a total of 189 to 58. The team was also selected by the "Pigskin Huddle" published by the Associated Negro Press as the black college national champion.

Schedule

References

North Carolina A&T
North Carolina A&T Aggies football seasons
Black college football national champions
North Carolina A&T football